Mirandeh (also Romanized as Mīrāndeh and Mīrondeh) is a village in Khomeh Rural District, in the Central District of Aligudarz County, Lorestan Province, Iran. At the 2006 census, its population was 35, in 9 families.

References 

Towns and villages in Aligudarz County